Batueta is a genus of Asian dwarf spiders that was first described by G. H. Locket in 1982.

Species
 it contains four species:
Batueta baculum Tanasevitch, 2014 – Laos, Thailand, Malaysia (Mainland, Borneo), Indonesia (Sumatra)
Batueta cuspidata Zhao & Li, 2014 – China
Batueta similis Wunderlich & Song, 1995 – China
Batueta voluta Locket, 1982 (type) – Laos, Vietnam, Thailand, Malaysia, Singapore

See also
 List of Linyphiidae species

References

Araneomorphae genera
Linyphiidae
Spiders of Asia